Ambrose Harold Palmer (16 October 1910 – 16 October 1990) was a talented world-class professional prize fighter and a leading Australian rules footballer of the 1930s and early 1940s.

Family
The third child of the  Victorian champion lightweight boxer William Arthur Palmer (1877-1940), and May Palmer (1885-1936), née Ranger, Ambrose Harold Palmer was born at Footscray, Victoria on 16 October 1910.

He married Emma May Gibson (1914-1993), at Footscray, on 12 September 1931.

Boxing

Boxer
Often referred to as "Young" Palmer — his father and his two elder brothers, David William "Dave" Palmer (1905-1966) and William Vincent "Billy" Palmer (1907-1947) were also noted boxers — he was a champion amateur boxer, who tuned professional, winning 57 of his professional bouts (losing only 7) from 1929 to 1938. Eventually managed by Hugh D. McIntosh, in the 1930s he held the Australian middleweight, light heavyweight and heavyweight boxing titles at the same time.

Trainer
He later became a renowned boxing trainer, notably for Jack Johnson world champion Johnny Famechon, and Len Dittmar.

1956 Olympic Games
In 1956 he was the official coach for the Australian boxing team at the 1956 Melbourne Olympics.

Football
Palmer made his debut in the back-pocket for Victorian Football League (VFL) club Footscray in the match against South Melbourne on 6 May 1933. He went on to play 83 matches for Footscray, retiring in 1943.

1939
In Round One of the 1939 VFL season, Footscray were playing Essendon Football Club and Palmer, resting in the forward-pocket, collided head-on with Essendon backman Stan Wilson, suffering sixteen jaw, cheekbone and skull fractures (he had been knocked out in a collision with Bill Shaw in the team's last pre-season practice match a week earlier). For a while the injuries were thought to be life-threatening, but Palmer eventually recovered, and although he did not play again that season, he went on to play another forty-four games for Footscray.

Military service
Palmer enlisted in the Second AIF in December 1941, but was declared medically unfit for duty and was discharged from the army in February 1942 because of "post-traumatic headache' ".

Death
He died at Yarraville, Victoria on 16 October 1990.

Recognition

Member of the Order of the British Empire (1971)
He was appointed Member of the Order of the British Empire (MBE) "for services to sport" in June 1971.

Sport Australia Hall of Fame (1985)
He was inducted into the Sport Australia Hall of Fame in 1985.

Australian National Boxing Hall of Fame (2003)
He was inducted into the Australian National Boxing Hall of Fame in 2003.

Footnotes

References

 Kent, George, "Palmer, Ambrose Harold (1910–1990)", in M. Nolan (ed.), Australian Dictionary of Biography, Volume 18: 1981-1990, L-Z, Melbourne University Press, (Carlton), 2012.
 Grinsted, Terry, "My Trip to Wagga Wagga with the Great Ambrose Palmer", Boxing Memories: Terry Grinsted.
 
 Drane, Robert, "The Method", insidesport.com.au, 21 April 2009.
 Atkinson, G. (1982) Everything you ever wanted to know about Australian rules football but couldn't be bothered asking, The Five Mile Press: Melbourne. .
 Munro, Jack, "Ambrose Palmer, Fine Boxer and Sportsman", The Sydney Morning Herald, (Saturday, 24 August 1946), p.9.
 Elliott, Jack, "How Far was Stribling in Earnest?", The Referee, (Wednesday, 6 July 1932), p.10.
 Palmer-Stribling Fight Round by Round, The Referee, (Wednesday, 6 July 1932), p.11.
 
 Was Always Palmer's Master, The Referee, (Wednesday, 6 July 1932), p.12.
 Popular Sportmen — Ambrose Palmer: He'd Rather Play Football, Pix, Vol.2 No.25, (Saturday, 17 December 1938), pp.11-12.
 World War Two Nominal Roll: Private Ambrose Harold Palmer (VX68317), Department of Veterans' Affairs.
 World War Two Service Record: Private Ambrose Harold Palmer (VX68317), National Archives of Australia.

External links
 
 
 Ambrose Palmer, at Boyles Football Photos.
"The Gentleman Boxer" The Age 20 May 2006

1910 births
1990 deaths
Australian rules footballers from Melbourne
Western Bulldogs players
Australian male boxers
Australian boxing trainers
Sport Australia Hall of Fame inductees
Australian Army personnel of World War II
Australian Army soldiers
People from Footscray, Victoria
Military personnel from Melbourne
Boxers from Melbourne